Pelli Sandadi is a 1996 Indian Telugu-language musical romance film written and directed by K. Raghavendra Rao. The film stars Srikanth, Ravali and Deepti Bhatnagar.

Pelli Sandadi was released on 12 January 1996 and was a major commercial success. Made on a budget of 1.25 crore, the film grossed 1215 crore at the box office. It has garnered five state Nandi Awards, and the Filmfare Award Telugu for Best Music. The film was also remade in Hindi as Mere Sapno Ki Rani (1997) and in Tamil as Ninaithen Vandhai (1998). The film's spiritual sequel titled Pelli SandaD was released in 2021.

Plot 
Vijay Krishna (Srikanth) is a musician from a musical family. He lives with two married sisters and their husbands and his uncle. All of his family is dedicated to music. His father (Satyanarayana) is looking for a suitable matrimonial alliance for Vijay who is in search of a girl whom he saw in a dream. He never saw her face in the dream but he saw a mole beside her belly button. The story continues in search of the girl. Meanwhile, his father arranges his marriage with a Kalyani (Ravali), who hails from a nearby village and belongs to a music family.

Meanwhile Vijay gets a job in Ooty as a music lecturer. There he finds his dream girl Swapna (Deepti Bhatnagar). He falls in love with her and proposes to her which she accepts. He comes back home to share the news about his love, but his father arranges the marriage. Later Swapna learns that the person she loves and Kalyani's fiance are the same. Swapna and Kalyani are actually sisters. Swapna then sacrifices her love and informs her sister that she has a terminal illness. She asks Vijay, as her dying wish to marry Kalyani. Meanwhile, Kalyani also learns that Vijay loves her younger sister Swapna. Eventually, Kalyani convinces her sister to marry Vijay and the film ends on a happy note.

Cast 

 Srikanth as Vijay Krishna
 Ravali as Kalyani
 Deepti Bhatnagar as Swapna
 Kaikala Satyanarayana as Vijay's father
 M. Balaiah as Kalyani & Swapna's Father
 Tanikella Bharani as Vijay's brother-in-law
 Babu Mohan as Kalyani & Swapna's Uncle
 Brahmanandam as N. V. Krishna (Vijay's Uncle)
 A.V.S. as Kalyani & Swapna's Uncle
 Sivaji Raja as Vijay's brother-in-law
 Raja Ravindra as engineer in quarry
 Sri Lakshmi as Kalyani & Swapna's Aunt
 Chitti Babu Punyamurthula as Paidi Talli
 Suthi Velu
 Jenny
 Ananth
 Gundu Hanumantha Rao  as priest
 Visweswara Rao
 Rajitha

Release 
The film grossed 1215 crore at the box office. It grossed  1.25 crore at Sandhya theatre in Hyderabad. The film had a 100 day theatrical run at 34 locations.

Soundtrack 
The soundtrack of the film was composed by M. M. Keeravani. Each song is set in major raagas of Carnatic music, such as Hindolam.

Awards 
Filmfare Awards South
Filmfare Award for Best Music Director – Telugu – M. M. Keeravani

Nandi Awards
Best Home Viewing Feature Film – Allu Aravind
Best Director – K. Raghavendra Rao
Best Choreographer – K. Raghavendra Rao
Best Music Director – M. M. Keeravani

Remakes 
The film was remade in Bengali as Biyer Phool (1996), in Hindi as Mere Sapno Ki Rani (1997) and in Tamil as Ninaithen Vandhai (1998).

Notes

References

External links 
 

1996 films
1990s Telugu-language films
Films directed by K. Raghavendra Rao
Films scored by M. M. Keeravani
Geetha Arts films
Indian romantic comedy films
Indian romantic musical films
1990s romantic musical films
Telugu films remade in other languages
Films shot in Vijayawada
Films about Indian weddings
1996 romantic comedy films